Andreas Falkvard Hansen (born 18 November 1966) is a retired Faroese football defender.

References

1966 births
Living people
Faroese footballers
Havnar Bóltfelag players
Association football defenders
Faroe Islands international footballers